A leadership election for Christian and Democratic Union – Czechoslovak People's Party (KDU-ČSL) was held on 20 November 2010. Pavel Bělobrádek was elected leader of the party.

Background
The election was held as a result of party's defeat in the 2010 legislative elections, in which the KDU-ČSL received less than 5% of the vote and failed to pass the electoral threshold. Then-leader Cyril Svoboda resigned and the party was temporarily headed by Michaela Šojdrová until the leadership election was held. Šojdrová originally did not plan to participate in the election, but later changed her mind and announced her candidature on 10 November 2010. Pavel Bělobrádek became his main rival. Other candidates were Jaroslav Orel and Jiřina Štouračová; Jiří Carbol also ran, but withdrew before voting began. A total of 459 delegates were allowed to vote.

Results

References

KDU-ČSL leadership elections
2010 elections in the Czech Republic
Christian and Democratic Union - Czechoslovak People's Party leadership election
November 2010 events in Europe